Tennis events were contested at the 1961 Summer Universiade in Sofia, Bulgaria.

Medal summary

Medal table

See also
 Tennis at the Summer Universiade

External links
World University Games Tennis on HickokSports.com

1961
Universiade
1961 Summer Universiade